Eilean Trodday is an island in The Minch just off the north coast of the Trotternish peninsula of Skye in Scotland.

The island was inhabited in the past  and there are the ruins of a small chapel, which may have been dedicated to St. Columba.

Lighthouse

Now a minor sector light, it marks The Minch's northbound route.

Shipwrecks
The Dutch trawler Alexanders ran aground and sank on the south side of Eilean Trodday on 29 January 1974. On 2 May 1976 the German Coaster  Nordhuk was carrying a cargo of grain from Gothenburg to Liverpool.

In 2002 the nuclear submarine  grounded on nearby Fladda-chuain whilst travelling at  during a traverse of the Fladda-chuain-Eilean Trodday trough, resulting in some damage to the submarine and three minor injuries to the crew. After the grounding the submarine re-surfaced and proceeded to the Faslane base by surface transit. The Banff registered trawler, Brothers BF138 was wrecked on Eilean Trodday on the morning of 1 June 2006 with the loss of two lives.

The island is an excellent dive site with items of interest being the wreck of the Nordhuk and the sheets of multi-coloured jewel anemones, although the tidal currents are strong outside of slack water.

See also

 List of islands in Scotland
 List of lighthouses in Scotland
 List of Northern Lighthouse Board lighthouses

Notes

References
 Baird, Bob (1995) Shipwrecks of the West of Scotland. Glasgow. Nekton Books. 
 

Uninhabited islands of Highland (council area)
Former populated places in Scotland